Václav Postránecký (8 September 1943 – 7 May 2019) was a Czech actor, director, theater teacher and dubber.

Selected filmography

Film
 At the Sign of the Reine Pédauque (1967)
 I Enjoy the World with You (1982)
 Černí baroni (1992)
 Ro(c)k podvraťáků (2006)
 Grapes (2008)
 You Kiss like a God (2009)
 2Bobule (2009)
 Bajkeři (2017)

Television
 Byl jednou jeden dům (1974) 
 The Youngest of the Hamr Family (1975)  
 Létající Čestmír (1983)  
 Zlá krev (1986)   
 O Kubovi a Stázině (1988)  
 Cirkus Humberto (1988)  
 Bylo nás pět (1994) 
 Doktoři z Počátků (2014)
 Vinaři (2015)
 Krejzovi (2018)

Play
 Lucerna (2008)
 The Weir (2000)
 Naši furianti

Dubbing
 Adventures of Robinson Crusoe, a Sailor from York (1982)

References

External links
 

1943 births
2019 deaths
Male actors from Prague
Czech male film actors
Czech male stage actors
Czech male voice actors
Czech male television actors
21st-century Czech male actors
20th-century Czech male actors
Recipients of the Thalia Award